Vincent Lindon (born 15 July 1959) is a French actor and filmmaker. For his role in the film The Measure of a Man (2015), Lindon won Best Actor at the 2015 Cannes Film Festival, Best Actor at the 41st César Awards and the IFFI Best Actor Award (Male) at the 46th International Film Festival of India.

Lindon was selected as the president of the jury for the main competition section of the 2022 Cannes Film Festival.

Early life and education
Vincent Lindon is the son of Laurent Lindon, who was director of the company Audioline. He is also the great-grandson of Fernande Citroën, the older sister of André Citroën and wife of Alfred Lindon (born Abner Lindenbaum), a Jewish jeweler and modern art collector originally from Krakow, Poland. Through his mother, Alix Dufaure, a journalist for Marie Claire, Lindon is a descendant of French Prime minister Jules Dufaure and Marshal Rémy Joseph Isidore Exelmans.

Lindon completed studies at the Lycée Victor-Duruy, where he obtained a baccalauréat scientifique. He then enrolled in an école supérieure de commerce, but lost interest in his studies after 22 days. In 1979, his mother secured an internship for him as a costume design assistant on the set of Alain Resnais' film My American Uncle (1980), on which he worked with actor Gérard Depardieu. He then spent six months in New York working as an assistant in charge of radio promotion with his uncle, Eric Dufaure, founder of the label Cachalot Records (Ian North, Die Hausfrauen, Medium Medium, Malaria, Stars of the Streets, Comateens, Made in France, Personal Effects). When he returned to Paris, his father-in-law Pierre Bénichou secured a position for him managing the microphones for the tour of comedian Coluche in 1981. He was also a courier for the newspaper Le Matin de Paris before entering the Cours Florent drama school.

Personal life
In the 1980s, Lindon was in a relationship with Claude Chirac, daughter of President Jacques Chirac, for nearly ten years. Lindon later had a highly-publicised relationship with Caroline, Princess of Monaco. Lindon has a son, Marcel, born in 1996. He married actress Sandrine Kiberlain in 1998, with whom he has a daughter, Suzanne, born in 2000. The couple met in 1993 on the set of the film L'Irrésolu (1994). They separated in 2003.

Selected filmography

Awards and nominations

References

External links

1959 births
Living people
People from Boulogne-Billancourt
French male film actors
French male television actors
20th-century French male actors
21st-century French male actors
Cours Florent alumni
French people of Polish-Jewish descent
French male screenwriters
French screenwriters
French film directors
Best Actor César Award winners
Best Actor Lumières Award winners
Cannes Film Festival Award for Best Actor winners
Magritte Award winners
IFFI Best Actor (Male) winners